D-060 is a west-east state road in northeastern Turkey that serves the land border crossing to Armenia, which is currently closed. The route D-060 continues in Armenia as M7.

Itinerary

{| class="wikitable"
!Province
!City/Town
!Distance fromprevious location 
!Distance fromWest end
!Distance fromEast end
|-
|Artvin
|Intersection  ||0 ||0 ||225
|-
|rowspan=6 |Erzurum
|Intersection  to Olur ||43 ||43 ||182
|-
|Intersection  Yolboyu, Oltu ||20 ||63 ||162
|-
|Intersection  to Kömürlü, Yusufeli ||9 ||72 ||153
|-
|Intersection  to SarıkamışIntersection  to Şenkaya ||8 ||80 ||145
|-
|Akşar, Şenkaya ||2 ||82 ||143
|-
|Aydoğdu, Şenkaya||13 ||95 ||130
|-
|rowspan=3 |Ardahan
|Göle ||17 ||112 ||113
|-
|Intersection  to Selim, Kars ||3 ||115 ||110
|-
|Balçeşme, Göle ||22 ||137 ||88
|-
|rowspan=7 |Kars
|Intersection  to Susuz ||32 ||169 ||56
|-
|Intersection  to Kars ||3 ||172 ||53
|-
|Intersection  to Arpaçay ||10 ||182 ||43
|-
|Şahnalar, Akyaka ||25 ||207 ||18
|-
|Akyaka, Kars ||6 ||213 ||12
|-
|Demirkent, Akyaka ||4 ||217 ||8
|-
|Tiknis border crossing ||8 ||225 ||0

Major intersections

See also
Lake Kuyucuk

References

060
Transport in Artvin Province
Transport in Erzurum Province
Transport in Ardahan Province
Transport in Kars Province
Akyazı District